Fake Empire Productions is the production company that was formed in 2010 by Josh Schwartz and Stephanie Savage to develop and produce television series and feature films. Their most notable productions include the series Gossip Girl (developed by Schwartz and Savage), Chuck (co-created by Schwartz and Chris Fedak), Hart of Dixie (created by Leila Gerstein and produced by Schwartz, Savage, and their producing partner Len Goldstein), The Carrie Diaries (developed by Amy B. Harris and produced by Schwartz and Savage), Dynasty (developed by Sallie Patrick, Schwartz, and Savage), Marvel's Runaways (created for television by Schwartz and Savage), and The CW shows Nancy Drew and Tom Swift. The company was formed to focus on television projects and produce films, with the intent of branching out into online series, music and books. Schwartz formerly operated under the banner of College Hill Pictures, Inc., which folded in the making of Fake Empire. In 2010, the company developed a first look deal with Paramount. In 2013, Fake Empire was moved from Warners to ABC, which was followed by a deal with Universal in 2014.

Both the film and television divisions of the company are overseen by Lis Rowinski.

Productions
The following tables lists the production credit of Fake Empire, and its previous incarnation, College Hill Pictures, Inc.

Films

TV movies

TV series

Web series

References

External links
 

Film production companies of the United States
Television production companies of the United States
Privately held companies based in California
Companies based in Los Angeles